This is a list of members of the Australian Senate from 1907 to 1910. Half of its members were elected at the 16 December 1903 election and had terms starting on 1 January 1904 and finishing on 30 June 1910; the other half were elected at the 12 December 1906 election and had terms starting on 1 January 1907 and finishing on 30 June 1913. They had an extended term as a result of the 1906 referendum, which changed Senate terms to finish on 30 June, rather than 31 December.

In May 1909 the Anti-Socialist Party (previously Free Trade) and most of the Protectionist Party merged to become the Commonwealth Liberal Party.

Notes

References

Bibliography

Members of Australian parliaments by term
20th-century Australian politicians
Australian Senate lists